Feriel Esseghir (born 29 October 1983) is an Algerian retired tennis player.

Esseghir has career-high WTA rankings of 381 in singles and 534 in doubles, both achieved in 2002. In her career, she was not able to win a title on the ITF circuit, and retired from pro tennis in 2003.

Playing for Algeria in Fed Cup, Esseghir has a win/loss record of 8–17.

She made her WTA Tour singles main-draw debut at the 2002 Morocco Open, in the doubles event partnering Meryem El Haddad.

ITF finals

Singles (0–1)

Fed Cup participation

Singles

Doubles

ITF Junior finals

Singles (2–4)

Doubles (8–2)

References

External links
 
 
 

1983 births
Living people
Sportspeople from Algiers
Algerian female tennis players
21st-century Algerian people